The X²O Badkamers Trophy is a Belgian cyclo-cross racing series sponsored by X²O Badkamers (X²O Bathrooms)  which previously was known as the DVV Trophy (2017–2019), BPost Bank Trophy (2012–2016) and until 2011–2012 as the Gazet van Antwerpen Trofee. Many races are held in the province of Antwerp with others being held across Belgium. The first ever event was held on 1 November 1987 in Putte-Peulis. It is part of the grand slam of cyclo-cross.

In 2012–2013, the way that the general classification was calculated was changed from a points system to using the riders' finishing times of each race (like a road racing stage race) with time 'bonuses' also available at an intermediate 'sprint' at the end of the first lap with 15, 10 and 5 seconds being awarded. The maximum time a rider can lose in the general classification is 5 minutes, excluding the bonus seconds. When a rider does not finish or does not start, he's also being handed a 5-minute time loss, excluding bonus seconds.

Results

Men

Women

External links
 Official Website (in Dutch)
 Cyclocross Oostmalle

 
Sports competitions in Antwerp
Cyclo-cross races
Cycle races in Belgium
Recurring sporting events established in 1987
1987 establishments in Belgium
Autumn events in Belgium